The Harvey Norman Women's Premiership  is a rugby league competition for clubs in New South Wales. It is the only state wide open age competition for women in New South Wales and is run by New South Wales Rugby League.

The NSWRL Women's Premiership started in 2005 as Sydney Metropolitan Women's Rugby League after the former competition folded in 2001.

Clubs

Previous Clubs 
 Berkeley Vale Panthers (2017)
 Cabramatta Two Blues (2018-2019, 2021)
 Canterbury-Bankstown Bulldogs (2018-19)
 CRL Newcastle (2018-2019)
 Cronulla-Caringbah Sharks (2017-2018)
 Forestville Ferrets (2017)
 Glebe Dirty Reds (2021)
 Glenmore Park Brumbies (2017)
 Greenacre Tigers (2017)
 Helensburgh Tigers (2021)
 North Newcastle (2017)
 Penrith Brothers (2018-2019)
 Redfern All Blacks (2017)
 St Marys Saints (2018, 2021-22)

Clubs that competed in the Sydney Metropolitan Women's Rugby League Premiership (2005-2016) included:
Auburn, Berkeley Vale Panthers, Blacktown, Canley Heights Dragons, Canley Vale Kookas, Cronulla-Caringbah Sharks, East Campbelltown Eagles, Forestville Ferrets, Greenacre Tigers, Guildford Raiders, Hunter Stars (2016 only), Maitland Pickers, Mounties, Newtown Jetettes, Parramatta Junior Eels, Redfern All Blacks, Windsor Wolves.

Clubs the completed in the Sydney Women's Rugby League premiership (1992-2002) included Bankstown, Blacktown, Bulli, North Sydney, Parramatta Junior Eels, Petersham-Lewisham Wildfires, South Sydney Juniors, Waverton Reds and Western Sydney Wildcats.

Results By Year

Grand Finals

2017

2018

2019

2020

2022

See also

Women's rugby league in Australia
Women's rugby league
Rugby League Competitions in Australia

References

Women's rugby league competitions in Australia
Rugby league competitions in New South Wales
Rugby league in Sydney
2017 establishments in Australia
Sports leagues established in 2017